National Route 42 is a major highway in South Korea, connecting Incheon with the city of Donghae, Gangwon Province.

Main stopovers
 Incheon
 Jung District - Nam District - Namdong District
 Gyeonggi Province
 Siheung - Ansan - Suwon - Yongin - Icheon - Yeoju
 Gangwon Province
 Wonju - Hoengseong County - Pyeongchang County - Jeongseon County - Donghae

Major intersections

 (■): Motorway
IS: Intersection, IC: Interchange

Incheon

Gyeonggi Province

Gangwon Province 

  Motorway sections
 Wonju Bupyeong Tunnel ~ Munmak IC / Munmak IS
 Wonju Gwangteo IS ~ Heungyang IS (Wonju Bypass Road)
 Donghae Sobi IS ~ Cheongun IS

References

42
Roads in Incheon
Roads in Gyeonggi
Roads in Gangwon